Shenmu or Sacred Tree station is a railway station on the Forestry Bureau Alishan Forest Railway line located in Alishan Township, Chiayi County, Taiwan.

Name
The station was named after a famous Alishan sacred tree that aged more than 3,000 years locally known as Shenmu. However, the tree was toppled in a storm in 1997.

History
The station was opened in 1914. In April 2011, a train on the Shenmu line derailed killing five passengers and injuring 113 others. The station was then subsequently closed. The station was then reopened on 20 January 2012.

Nearby stations
 <-- Alishan Forest railway -->

See also
 List of railway stations in Taiwan

References

1914 establishments in Taiwan
Alishan Forest Railway stations
Railway stations in Chiayi County
Railway stations opened in 1914